The Topeka Owls was the primary name of the minor league baseball franchise based in Topeka, Kansas, USA.

History

Topeka first began professional play in 1886 as the Topeka Capitals and had numerous names throughout their existence as a minor league team. Topeka was called the Topeka Reds (1960–1961), Topeka Hawks (1956–1959), Topeka Owls (1946–1954, 1939–1942), Topeka Senators (1933–1934, 1930–1931, 1924–1926), Topeka Jayhawks (1932, 1927–1929, 1909–1915), Topeka Kaws (1922–1923), Topeka Savages (1916), Topeka White Sox (1905–1908), Topeka Saints (1904), Topeka Colts (1897), Topeka Populists (1893), Topeka Giants (1895, 1898) and the Topeka Capitals (1886, 1893).

Topeka competed in various leagues with various Major League Baseball affiliations. Topeka competed as a member the Illinois–Indiana–Iowa League (1959–1961), Western League (1956–1958, 1933–1934, 1929–1931, 1909–1916, 1886–1887), Western Association (1946–1954, 1939–1942, 1932, 1927–1928, 1924, 1905–1908, 1893), Southwestern League (1925–1926, 1922–1923), and the Kansas State League (1895, 1897–1898).
 
The Owls and their other namesakes were affiliates of the Cincinnati Reds (1959–1961, 1933–1934), Milwaukee Braves (1956–1958), Chicago White Sox (1953–1954), Chicago Cubs (1951–1952), St. Louis Browns (1939–1940, 1930) and St. Louis Cardinals (1927–1928).

Ballparks

The Topeka teams played at the Topeka Baseball Park, located at 15th and Adams. They later played at Freefair Park. Beginning in 1940 they played at Owl Ballpark located at North Topeka Boulevard and Lyman Road, at the address of 225 NW. Lyman. The park was expanded from 2750 seats to 4700 seats during its existence with dimensions of (Left, Center, Right): 335-410-315 (1939) and 316-403-309 (1961). Owl Ballpark was demolished in 1963.

Notable alumni

Baseball Hall of Fame Alumni

 Jake Beckley (1910) Inducted, 1971
Notable alumni

 Jack Baldschun (1959)
 Ted Blankenship (1931)
 Dave Bristol (1961)
 Duff Cooley (1908–1909, 1911)
 Vic Davalillo (1960–1961) MLB All-Star
 Debs Garms (1930) 1940 NL Batting Title
 Charlie Gelbert (1927)
 Tommy Harper (1960–1961) MLB All-Star
 Tommy Helms (1961) 2× MLB All-Star; 1966 NL Rookie of the Year
 Joe Heving (1926)
 Bug Holliday (1887)
 Tom Hughes (1905)
 Jim Maloney (1959) MLB All-Star
 George McQuinn (1958) 7× MLB All-Star
 Willie Mitchell (1924)
 Fritz Ostermueller (1928)
 Bill Rigney (1940) MLB All-Star
 Ray Starr (1928) MLB All-Star
 Gus Suhr (1923) MLB All-Star
 Jesse Tannehill (1924) 1901 NL ERA Title
 Johnny Vander Meer (1959–1960) 4× MLB All-Star

References

Baseball teams established in 1886
Defunct minor league baseball teams
Professional baseball teams in Kansas
Baseball teams disestablished in 1961
Defunct baseball teams in Kansas
St. Louis Browns minor league affiliates
Chicago Cubs minor league affiliates
Chicago White Sox minor league affiliates
Milwaukee Braves minor league affiliates
St. Louis Cardinals minor league affiliates
Cincinnati Reds minor league affiliates
Sports in Topeka, Kansas
1886 establishments in Kansas
1961 disestablishments in Kansas